Blundellsands is a Metropolitan Borough of Sefton ward in the Sefton Central Parliamentary constituency that covers the localities of Blundellsands and Brighton-le-Sands. The total population of this ward taken at the 2011 Census was 11,280.

Councillors
 indicates seat up for re-election.
 indicates by-election.

Election results

Elections of the 2020s

Elections of the 2010s

References

Wards of the Metropolitan Borough of Sefton